GeneDB is a genome database for eukaryotic and prokaryotic pathogens.

References

External links

 http://www.genedb.org

Biological databases
Pathogenic microbes